Wishing Stairs ( also known as Whispering Corridors 3: Wishing Stairs) is a 2003 South Korean horror film. It is the third installment of the Whispering Corridors film series set in girls high schools, but, as with all films in the series, is unrelated to the others; apart from a song being sung in one scene that is a pivotal plot in Voice.

Plot
Yun Jin-sung (Song Ji-hyo) from humble background and privileged Kim So-hee (Park Han-byul) are friends studying ballet at an all-girls art school. So-hee mainly dances to please her mother yet possesses natural talent and grace for the art, thus gains much favoritism from the faculty while Jin-sung has to catch up to her friend with greater effort. Despite circumstances, the two remain best friends and So-hee seems to harbour deeper feelings towards Jin-sung. However, their friendship sours when they find themselves competing for a single spot at a Russian ballet school and the odds are heavily in So-hee's favor. Jin-sung learns from a timid, overweight and severely bullied sculpture student named Eom Hye-ju (Jo An) of an old legend that if a person climbs the twenty eight steps leading up to the school's dormitory and finds a twenty ninth step, a fox spirit will grant that person's wish. Curious, Jin-sung climbs the stairs and upon coming across the twenty ninth, eagerly wishes for the spot. To her surprise and anger, So-hee is selected instead. Jin-sung declares her hatred toward So-hee and accidentally sends her down a flight of stairs during a row. So-hee is left unconscious and hospitalized.

Jin-sung learns that the injuries render So-hee unable to continue pursuing ballet. She tries to apologize, but receives no response and leaves with guilt. The next day, she learns that So-hee has committed suicide. As the fight between the two was witnessed by several others, Jin-sung is now subjected to other students' bullying, who believe that she intentionally injured So-hee out of jealousy. Jin-sung's wish comes true and she gets the spot for the ballet school but her fellow students treat her coldly. In addition, So-hee's wrathful spirit restlessly haunts her.

Affected by the death of So-hee, the only person to have treated her with kindness, Hye-ju (who has become slim due to a wish fulfilled by the stairs at the price of suffering bulimia) attempts to keep So-hee's belongings for herself, which made her the target of further bullying, especially from Han Yun-ji, a fellow sculpture student. She climbs the steps and wishes for So-hee to come back. So-hee returns as a twisted spirit and possesses Hye-ju. The possessed Hye-ju confronts Yun-ji for bullying her and stabs her to death. Jin-Sung encounters Hye-ju, who tries to convince her that she is So-hee which frightens Jin-sung into fleeing. The spirit of So-hee makes Hye-ju light a match in a basement drenched in paint thinner, leaving the troubled girl to perish in flames.

The night before Jin-sung's departure to the ballet school, she is haunted by So-hee. Unable to endure the torment, she tries to climb the stairs again in order to wish So-hee away. Before she can reach the 29th step, So-hee appears and holds her as Jin-sung confesses that she did not hate her and simply wanted to accomplish something of her own and be happy. Believing that Jin-sung does not love her as much she does, So-hee crushes Jin-sung's stomach with her embraces, killing her, then vanishes.

Some time later, a new student moves into the dorm room that Jin-sung once occupied. A picture of Jin-sung and So-hee is seen on the floor. In the photo, So-hee's irises disappear, implying that she still remains.

Cast
Song Ji-hyo as Yun Jin-sung
Park Han-byul as Kim So-hee
Jo An as Eom Hye-ju
Park Ji-yeon as Han Yun-ji
Kong Sang-ah as Kyeong-jin
Lee Se-yeon as Young-seon
Hong Soo-ah as sculpture club member
Lee Min-jung as dance double for Yun Jin-sung
Kwak Ji-min as dance class junior
Moon Jung-hee as dance teacher

Notes
The film itself seems to mirror the ballet Giselle, which the girls in the film are studying, as well as drawing upon the classic short story "The Monkey's Paw", with So-hee as Giselle, and Jin-sung as Albrecht. Unhappy with always having to play the "prince" to So-hee's princess, Jin-sung betrays So-hee, which in turn leads to So-hee being crippled and commits suicide after her friend Jin-sung confesses she has hated her all along. When So-hee's spirit is wished back, Jin-sung is haunted by So-hee's ghost, the love she once felt for her friend warped by Jin-sung's hurtful actions.

As in the two previous movies, this film has strong themes of friendship, betrayal, and the taboo of lesbian affairs in an all-girls school.

Release
Wishing Stairs was released on the August 1, 2003, and exceeded 680,000 nationwide audiences within three days of its release. By August 10, the second week of its release, it was announced that it had surpassed 1.3 million nationwide audiences. In the Philippines, the film was released by Cinema Service on February 11, 2004.

The film which was released in Singapore, has achieved $377,298 (USD) for 11 days from the 13th to the 23rd, setting up as the highest box office record in South Korea. Wishing Stairs has recorded an overseas export of $500,000 (USD) across 10 countries including Japan, Taiwan, and Thailand.

References

External links

2003 films
2000s Korean-language films
2003 horror films
Films about ballet
South Korean horror films
South Korean supernatural horror films
2000s South Korean films